Rebel Galaxy is a space Western-styled space trading and combat simulation single-player video game developed and published by (at the time) two-person studio Double Damage Games. It was released on Steam and GOG.com for Microsoft Windows and OS X on October 20, 2015. Xbox One and PlayStation 4 versions were released in January 2016.

A prequel to the game, Rebel Galaxy Outlaw, was released on 13 August 2019 on the Epic Games Store, and later for the Nintendo Switch, PlayStation 4, Xbox One, and on Steam on 22 September 2020.

Gameplay 
The game features space combat in capital ships in a randomly generated universe. While non-player fighter craft and gunships are capable of three-dimensional maneuvering, the player and other capital ships are restricted to a two-dimensional plane of movement with combat focusing on using broadsides to attack and defeat enemy ships. Similar to earlier space flight simulator games such as Freelancer, players are free to pursue various activities, such as pirating, trading, or bounty hunting, in addition to completing story missions to advance the plot.

Soundtrack
Rebel Galaxy uses licensed blues rock and country rock tracks from artists including Blues Saraceno, Nick Nolan, The Blue News, and Abbas Premjee.

Reception 

Rebel Galaxy has received generally favorable reviews, according to review aggregation website Metacritic, which assigned the game a score of 75, based on 28 reviews. The PlayStation 4 and Xbox One versions of the game received Metacritic scores of 64 and 76 respectively.

References

External links 

 
 

2015 video games
Space opera video games
Space trading and combat simulators
Space Western video games
Single-player video games
Windows games
MacOS games
PlayStation 4 games
Video games developed in the United States
Xbox One games